This is a list of WBC Muaythai female world champions, showing every female world champion certificated by the World Boxing Council Muaythai (WBC Muaythai). The WBC, which is one of the four major governing bodies in professional boxing, started certifying their own Muay Thai world champions in 19 different weight classes in 2005.

Welterweight

Lightweight

Featherweight

Super bantamweight

Bantamweight

Super flyweight

Flyweight

Mini flyweight

See also
List of WBC Muaythai world champions
List of IBF Muaythai world champions
List of WBC Muaythai female international champions

References

Lists of Muay Thai champions
WBC
Muay thai
Lists of women by occupation